Hyperdimension Neptunia: The Animation is a 2013 Japanese anime television series based on the Hyperdimension Neptunia video game series although featuring a storyline independent of the games themselves. In the world of Gamindustri, beings known as Goddesses rule over the four countries: Planeptune, Lastation, Lowee, and Leanbox. After having fought over Share energy for many years, the Goddesses signed a treaty which forbids each from taking Share energy from the other using forceful means.

The anime adaptation is produced by David Production of Japan and directed by Masahiro Mukai. Series composition and script writing are done by Shogo Yasukawa, with a musical score composed by Hiroaki Tsutsumi, Kenji Kaneko and Masaru Yokoyama. Character designs are done by Hitomi Takechi, based on the original designs by Tsunako along with art direction by Masanobu Nomura and sound direction by Jin Aketagawa. A manga series illustrated by Mikage Baku which complements the television animation, titled Hyperdimension Neptune: The Animation - Hello New World, began serialisation within the June 2013 issue of Dengeki Maoh. A spin-off novel of the anime, titled Hyperdimension Neptune TGS Hono no Futsukakan, was published by MF Bunko J and released 25 May 2013.

The twelve episode series aired from July 12 to September 27, 2013 on Tokyo MX and were later aired on BS11, KBS, Sun TV, and tvk. The series was acquired by Funimation for online streaming in North America with both the English dub and the original Japanese dub with  English subtitles.

Insert songs include "Hard beat x Break beat" by 5pb. The OVA episode contains the insert song  by nao, which is also the opening theme song of Hyperdimension Neptunia Victory.


Episode list

References

External links
  

Hyperdimension Neptunia
Hyperdimension Neptunia: The Animation